Bertram Larsen was a leading Danish manufacturer of tower clocks. The firm created a vast number of tower clocks and Carillons for Danish churches, castles and manor houses, town halls, railway stations and other landmark buildings. It was also responsible for the restoration of a significant number of historic clocks, including Lund astronomical clock in Lund Cathedral in 1909–1923.

History

Early history, 1827–1880
The firm was founded in 1827 by Gustav Zettervall in Sorø. He later moved the operations first to Ringsted and then Køge. The firm was from 1847 continued by his foster son Bertram Larsen (1823–1877). After Bertram Larsen's death in 1877, it was continued by his widow Juliane Emilie Thygesen (1820–1901) under the management of their son Julius.

Julius Bertram Larsen, 1880–1935
Julius Bertram Larsen (1854–1935) moved the firm to Copenhagen when his mother ceded the ownership of it in 1880.

Fridtjof Bertram-Larsen, 1935–1970s
The firm was after Julius bertram Larsen's death in 1935 continued by his son, Fridtjof Bertram-Larsen (1891–1980). His works include the carillons at Odense Cathedral, Ribe  Cathedral and Church of Our Saviour. The firm closed in the 1970s.

Selected works

Tower clocks
 Frederiksholms Kanal 18, Copenhagen (1870s)
 Herrested  Church, Herrested (1880)
 Church of Our Lady, Svendborg (1884)
 Ærøskøbing Church, Ærøskøbing (1885)
 Svendborg Town Hall, Svendborg
 Jesus Church, Copenhagen (1891/1895)
 Dipylon, Dipylon, Copenhagen (1892)
 St. Nicolas' Church, Svendborg (1894)
 Emmaus Church, Copenhagen (1895)
 Frederiksborg Castle, Hollerød (1895)
 Holy Cross Church, Copenhagen (1895)
 Kongegården, Korsør (1901)
 Kastelskirken, Copenhagen (1895)
 Aarhus Cathedral, Aarhus (1907)
 Meilgaard, Djursland (1921)
 Torbenfeldt, Holbæk Municipality (1921)
 Hobro Tinghus, Hobro (1922)
 Amalienborg Palace, Copenhagen
 Slaglille Church, Slaglille (No. 806, 1908)
 St. Canute's Cathedral, Odense
 Copenhagen Cathedral, Copenhagen
 Gutenberghus, Copenhagen
 Gammel Holtegård, Rudersdal Municipality, Denmark
 Søllerød Town Hall, Rudersdal Municipality (1943)

Restored tower clocks
 Ledreborg, Lejre (1875)
 Dragør Church, Dragør (1882-1885)
 St. Peter's Church, Copenhagen (1900s)
 Reformed Church (1916/1918/1933)
 Dannemare Church, Lolland, Denmark (1887)
 Lund astronomical clock, Lund Cathedral, Lund, Sweden (1909-23)
 Roskilde Cathedral, Roskilde (1931)

 Isaak Habrecht's astronomical clock in Rosenborg Castle, Copenhagen
 Tower clock of Church of Our Saviour, Copenhagen
 Planetarium of the Round Tower, Copenhagen
 St. Nicolas' Church, Køge
 St, Nicolas' Church, Copenhagen
 Regensen, Copenhagen

Carillon s
 Frederiksborg Chapel, Hillerød (1886)

Restored carillons
 Carillon of Ledreborg, Lejre

See also
 Henrik Kyhl

References

External links

Clock manufacturing companies of Denmark
Danish companies established in 1827
Defunct companies of Denmark